Brianurus is a genus of Silurian trilobites known from Canada. It was originally described from the Whittaker Formation (Northwest Territories). It is named after Professor Brian D. E. Chatterton from the University of Alberta.

References

Encrinuridae genera
Silurian trilobites of North America
Fossil taxa described in 1995
Taxa named by Richard Fortey